Bertha (minor planet designation: 154 Bertha) is a main-belt asteroid. It was discovered by the French brothers Paul Henry and Prosper Henry on 4 November 1875, but the credit for the discovery was given to Prosper. It is probably named after Berthe Martin-Flammarion, sister of the astronomer Camille Flammarion.

Observations performed at the Palmer Divide Observatory in Colorado Springs, Colorado in during 2007 produced a light curve with a period of 22.30 ± 0.03 hours and a brightness range of 0.10 ± 0.02 in magnitude. A 1998 measurement gave a value of 27.6 hours, which doesn't fit the PDO data. In 2011, observations from the Organ Mesa Observatory in Las Cruces, New Mexico were used to determine a rotation period of 25.224 ± 0.002 hours with a brightness variability of 0.10 ± 0.01 magnitude, ruling out previous studies.

This is classified as a C-type asteroid and it has an estimated diameter of about 187 km.

References

External links 
 Lightcurve plot of 154 Bertha, Palmer Divide Observatory, B. D. Warner (2007)
 Asteroid Lightcurve Database (LCDB), query form (info )
 Dictionary of Minor Planet Names, Google books
 Asteroids and comets rotation curves, CdR – Observatoire de Genève, Raoul Behrend
 Discovery Circumstances: Numbered Minor Planets (1)-(5000) – Minor Planet Center
 
 

000154
Discoveries by Paul Henry and Prosper Henry
Named minor planets
000154
18751104